City School can refer to:

The City School (Pakistan) in Pakistan
City School (Vancouver), an alternative program in King George Secondary School in Vancouver, British Columbia, Canada
City School (Toronto), Canada
The City School (Sheffield), former name of Outwood Academy City